Tacuba is a municipality of El Salvador.

Tacuba may also refer to:
 Tacuba, Mexico City, a district in Mexico City, formerly a separate municipality
 Metro Tacuba, a station of the Mexico City Metro
 Tlacopan or Tacuba, a pre-Columbian polity

See also
 Café Tacuba, a musical group from Naucalpan, Mexico